The Hinckley 38 is a sailboat that was designed by Sparkman & Stephens as a cruiser-racer and first built in 1968.

The boat is a development of the Hughes 38-1 and, like that design and the Hughes 38-2, Hughes 38-3 and the North Star 38, is a version of Sparkman & Stephens' design number 1903.

Production
The design's hulls were built by Hughes Boat Works in Centralia, Ontario, Canada and then shipped to Hinckley Yachts in Southwest Harbor, Maine, where the deck was added and the boat finished. Production ran from 1968 to 1970 with at total of 28 boats completed.

Design
The Hinckley 38 is a recreational keelboat, built predominantly of fibreglass, with wood trim. It has a masthead sloop rig with a keel-stepped mast; a raked stem; a raised counter, reverse transom; a skeg-mounted rudder controlled by a wheel and a fixed, swept fin keel. It displaces  and carries  of ballast.

The design has sleeping accommodation for six people, with a double "V"-berth in the bow cabin and two a straight settees, plus two pilot berths in the main cabin. The galley is located on the port side just forward of the companionway ladder. The galley is "L"-shaped and is equipped with a three-burner stove, an ice box and a sink. A navigation station is opposite the galley, on the starboard side. The head is located just aft of the bow cabin on the port side.

For upwind sailing the design may be equipped with one of a series of jibs or genoas and for sailing downwind the design may be equipped with a symmetrical spinnaker.

See also
List of sailing boat types

References

Keelboats
1960s sailboat type designs
Sailing yachts
Sailboat type designs by Sparkman and Stephens
Sailboat types built by Hughes Boat Works
Sailboat types built by Hinckley Yachts